AS GMIA is a football (soccer) club from Chad based in N'Djamena.

The club currently plays in the Chad Premier League the top division of Chadian football.

Stadium
Currently the team plays at the 30,000 capacity Stade Omnisports Idriss Mahamat Ouya.

References

External links

Football clubs in Chad
N'Djamena